tvOne (Formerly known as Lativi) is an Indonesian free-to-air television network based in East Jakarta. tvOne is owned by Visi Media Asia, a unit of Bakrie Group.

As Lativi, The channel was test broadcast on 17 January 2002 at 4:00pm local time, and was officially formal launched took place on 30 July 2002 at 4:00pm. The final transmission and broadcast aired on 14 February 2008 at 7:30pm. The network was then sold by Abdul Latief in 2007 and the new owners changed the name from Lativi to TvOne.

History

As Lativi 
As part of the boom in national television networks, channels and stations in the 2000s, Lativi was one of five new terrestrial television networks which were granted a license to broadcast nationwide in Indonesia. It was initially owned by Abdul Latief, previously Minister of Labor and also a famous businessman.

After Lativi bankruptcy 
By 2007, ownership of the network was transferred to Aburizal Bakrie and Erick Thohir (as president director) due to debt and poor network management.

The television network officially formal relaunched took place as tvOne on 14 February 2008 at 7:30pm local time. It was opened by the then President of Indonesia, Susilo Bambang Yudhoyono at Merdeka Palace in Jakarta. Anindya Bakrie (the son of Aburizal Bakrie) was named the Chief Commissioner and Erick Thohir as the President Director.

On 14 February 2020 during its 12th anniversary, station ID was rebranded after 8 years being unchanged; including news openings and its themes. However, its logo remained unchanged until 2023 when tvOne adopted the flat design of its logo and removed world's map on the globe as part of its 15th anniversary.

Domestic and international bureaus 
tvOne had a domestic and international bureaus in:
 Beijing, China
 Doha, Qatar
 Polonia, Medan
 Hong Kong 
 Kuala Lumpur, Malaysia
 London, United Kingdom
 Manila, Philippines
 Melbourne, Australia
 Moscow, Russia
 Munich, Germany
 New York City, United States
 Tokyo, Japan
 Karanganyar, Central Java
 Rappocini, Makassar
 Jemursari, Surabaya

Programming 
tvOne broadcasts a mixture of news and sports. The network is now more targeted towards A and B socio-economic groups. Currently, tvOne broadcasts general news and current affairs programming during the daily schedule and some sports and live events programming during afternoons and some evening and weekend timeslots. Aside from its daily news bulletins, tvOne broadcasts a three-minute news summary every hour outside its bulletins and live breaking news. Since 2008, tvOne has successfully maintained its position as the country's #1 TV news channel. Significant daily events are presented in “Breaking News” which has become a leading reference for viewers throughout the country. During the legislative elections and also the presidential and vice presidential election debates, tvOne generally ranks as the #1 news channel, beating the general entertainment channels.

News One 
 Kabar Pagi – A two-hour morning news bulletin at 04:30 WIB with daily national and international news reports.
 Kabar Siang – A two-hour lunchtime news bulletin at 11:00 WIB with Indonesian and international news events and reports.
 Kabar Pasar – A 30-minute business news bulletin at 09:30 & 14:00 WIB. Kabar Pasar shows all the latest information from the world of business and finance. The last edition of the program was aired on 3 March 2023.
 Ragam Perkara – A 30-minute crime news bulletin at 10:30 WIB on Monday to Friday.
 Kabar Pilihan – A 60-minute afternoon news bulletin at 14:30 WIB with the latest news and top stories from around the world and Indonesia, as chosen by the viewers themselves.
 Kabar Petang – A two-hour evening news bulletin at 16:30 WIB with news dialogues and top stories from around the world and Indonesia. During this program, news from other regions within Indonesia is shown by regional newsrooms in four regions (Medan, Surabaya, Banjarmasin and Ujungpandang). Ends at 18:30 (except before Liga 2).
 Kabar Utama – This is one of the channel's two late-night news bulletins. It airs at 20:00 WIB with daily national and international news reports.
 Kabar Hari Ini – This is one of the channel's two late-night news bulletins. It airs at 22:30 WIB, summarising all of the top stories across Indonesia and other areas from the previous twenty-four hours. On Tuesdays, it is aired after Indonesia Lawyers Club. First airs on March 5, 2012, and replaced Kabar Malam on June 6, 2016.
 Kabar Arena – A 30-minute sports news bulletin at 06:00 WIB and 23:30 WIB. Kabar Arena shows all the latest information in the world of sports, from Indonesia and around the world.

Talkshow One 
 Apa Kabar Indonesia Pagi – A 90-minute morning talkshow at 06:30 WIB, based on the latest and ongoing news topics and events in Indonesia and around the world. This program is broadcast live from Wisma Nusantara, Central Jakarta and Epicentrum Walk, South Jakarta.
 Coffee Break – A 60-minute talkshow, formerly part of an extended hour from Apa Kabar Indonesia, at 09:30 WIB, live from the ground floor of Epicentrum Walk, Jakarta. This program show product advertising.
 Apa Kabar Indonesia Siang – A 150-minute afternoon talkshow at 13:00 WIB, based on the latest and ongoing news topics and events in Indonesia and around the world. This program is broadcast live from Epicentrum Walk, South Jakarta. The afternoon edition of the program was first aired on 6 March 2023.
 Apa Kabar Indonesia Malam – A 60-minute early-evening talkshow at 18:30 WIB with news and interactive discussions. This program brings all the latest daily news from Indonesia and worldwide, followed by an interactive talkshow with several hot news topics of the day.
 Indonesia Lawyers Club – A live, 3-hour talkshow at 20:00 WIB on Tuesdays, hosted by Karni Ilyas, based on the latest issues happening in Indonesia, with a congregation of lawyers and parliament members from Indonesia sharing their opinions and analysis. ILC was awarded as the Best Talkshow Program at the Panasonic Gobel Awards in 2013 and 2014. The show aired its final episode on 15 December 2020. The program was later moved to its own YouTube channel starting from 28 October 2021.
 Ayo Hidup Sehat – A 60-minute health program. It airs every weekday afternoon at 13:00 WIB, with discussions and information on health and wellness.
 Indonesia Business Forum – Airs every Thursday at 20:00 WIB.
 Catatan Demokrasi – Airs every Tuesday at 20:00 WIB.
 Fakta – Airs every Monday at 20:00 WIB.
 Dua Sisi – Airs every Wednesday at 20:00 WIB.
 E-Talkshow – Airs every Friday at 20:00 WIB.

Sport One 
 Football Vaganza
Live and Best World Boxing
Premier Boxing Champions (2015–present) (exclusive PPV coverage in January 2019 only and licensed from beIN Sports (2015 until May 2019, exc. PPV), Mola TV (2020 only, inc. PPV), and Emtek (2020–present))
 Matchroom Boxing (2019–2020)
 Golden Boy
Top Rank (until 2018, returned again 2020–present)
 One Pride MMA (2016–present)
 One Prix (2019–present)
 Brasil Global Tour (two matches in October 2019 only)
 Liga Indonesia Putra (2013, 2017–2019)
Liga 1 (until 2018)
Liga 2 (until 2019)
 Indonesian Basketball League (2003–2009, returned again for 2018–19 season only)
2017 Supercopa de España

Licensed from Fox Sports :

 Bundesliga (2019 Super Cup only)
 UFC (delayed fights, 2018–present)
 Formula E (nine races in eight ePs only in 2018–19, in 2019–20 only aired the Berlin grand final) (from 2019 New York ePrix also licensed from Mola TV)
Asia Road Racing Championship (2020–present)

Reality One 
 Damai Indonesiaku
 Menyingkap Tabir
 Telusur

Presenters

Current 

 Abdel Achrian (E-Talkshow)
 Aditya Nugroho
 Agita Mahlika
 Alfath Tauhid
 Amelia Yachya (ex-news anchor GTV and CNN Indonesia)
 Andromeda Mercury
 Anggia Ebony
 Anna Thealita
 Arief Fadhil
 Aryo Widiardi
 Bagus Priambodo
 Balques Manisang
 Bayu Andrianto
 Beddu Tohar (Rumah Mamah Dedeh)
 Brigita Manohara
 Chacha Annissa
 Diana Suganda (Hidup Sehat)
 Dwi Anggia
 Dr. Eklendro Senduk (Hidup Sehat)
 Gina Fita
 Imran Tajuddin
 Jasmine Annisa Rachmadi
 Kamaratih Purnama Kusuma
 Karni Ilyas (Former as Liputan 6 SCTV News Director, 1999-2005)
 Raska Karra Syam (ex-news anchor iNews)
 Ken Anne Kartika Sari (ex-news anchor Kompas TV)
 M. Agung Izzulhaq (Damai Indonesiaku, Former as News Anchor and Voice Over Indosiar Program Promotion)
 Mamah Dedeh (Rumah Mamah Dedeh)
 Maria Elgyptia Assegaf
 Maria Gerarda
 Muhammad Sofyan
 Natascha Germania (Football Vaganza)
 Prima Alvernia (ex-news anchor GTV)
 Putri Violla
 Putri Windasari (ex-news anchor Trans 7)
 Rendra Kusuma
 Reza Prahadian
 Rizky Darmansyah
 Seera Safira
 Shinta Syamsul Arief
 Tengku Nissa (Hidup Sehat)
 Tiara Harahap
 Tysa Novenny
 Venna Kintan
 Wika Salim (E-Talkshow)
 Windy Wellingtonia
 Yaumi Fitri
 Yohana Gabriela
 Yudi Handoyo

Former 

 Suchi Mentari
 Rendy Wicaksana (now at VOA New York bureau)
 Zosa Sosiana 
 Stephanie Susanto
 Florentia Anindita
 Gloria Anastasia Siegers (ex-news anchor Kompas TV)
 Winda Irawan
 Abraham Silaban (moved to iNews)
 Diaz Kaslina
 Elvira Khairunissa (moved to CNN Indonesia)
 Alfito Deannova (now on detik.com)
 Mascarana
 Panji Himawan
 Suli Kusumo
 Bonardo Aritonang
 Sutra Karmelia
 Tina Talisa (Former as Program Announcement RCTI year 2003 with Stephan Tambunan)
 Andrie Djarot (deceased)
 Grace Natalie (now at Partai Solidaritas Indonesia)
 Indiarto Priadi (ex-news anchor Liputan 6 SCTV)
 Rendra Kusuma
 Harya Digdaya (now at PT. Hutama Karya (Persero) as the Assistant Manager Corporate Communications)
 Paramitha Soemantri
 Astrid Katrene
 Atika Sunarya
 Indy Rahmawati (ex-news anchor Liputan 6 SCTV)
 Divi Lukmansyah
 Muhammad Rizky (ex-news anchor Trans TV)
 Adolf Posumah
 Andini Nurmalasari
 Anita Mae (move to CNN Indonesia)
 Atika Sunarya
 Ariyo Ardi
 Aryo Widiardi
 Choky Sitohang
 Cindy Sistyarani (moved to Kompas TV)
 Dewi Budianti
 Fanni Imaniar (moved to GTV and MNC News)
 Farah Dilla
 Fauzan Zaman (Former as Premier League and Serie A Commentary on SCTV)
 Fenny Anastasia
 Ike Suharjo
 Iwan Sukmawan
 Jemmy Darusman (moved to Indosiar)
 Kanty Widjaja
 Lady Malino (moved to CNN Indonesia)
 Olivia Fendry
 Nane Nindya
 Pramita Andini
 Prima Genuita
 Reza Ramadhansyah (moved to SCTV)
 Sally Adelia
 Sandra Olga
 Sheila Purnama (moved to Indosiar and Ajwa TV)
 Ventin Oktavi
 Winny Charita
 Yenny Yusra
 Yunita Prima
 Shinta Puspitasari (Retired in 2019, moved to Australia)
 Desti Kusumo
 Dita Faisal
 Cornelia Amy (Retired in 2022)

Controversy 
In late 2006, the network was involved in a controversy regarding a nine-year-old boy who died after suffering injuries while allegedly trying to imitate the staged moves of performers on WWE Friday Night SmackDown! The network decided to pull the show and all other WWE programs following public outcry. Authorities, however, downplayed connections between wrestling and the death of the boy. The chief of the Bandung Crime and Detective Unit said at a press conference that there was no reason to believe that the child's death had anything to do with watching wrestling.

Identity

Logos

Slogans
As Lativi
 Saluran Penuh Nilai Dan Makna (17 January 2002-7 August 2004)
 Pasti (7 August 2004-31 December 2006)
 Berani Beda (1 January-31 December 2007)
 Memang Beda (1 January 2008-14 February 2008)

As tvOne
 Memang Beda (14 February 2008-14 February 2010, 2 March 2012-14 February 2023)
 Terdepan Mengabarkan (14 February 2010-2 March 2012, 14 February 2023-present)
 Menuju Satu Dunia (24 February 2011-2 March 2012)
 tvOne, TV Pemilu. Kami Kabarkan, Anda Putuskan (used for 2009, 2014, 2019 and 2024 elections)

See also 
 List of television stations in Indonesia
 Media of Indonesia

References

External links 
  Official Site

Bakrie Group
Television channels and stations established in 2002
Mass media in Jakarta
2002 establishments in Indonesia
24-hour television news channels in Indonesia
Television networks in Indonesia
Indonesian news websites